Yeltsin is a Russian masculine surname, its feminine counterpart is Yeltsina. Outside Russia it was also occasionally used as a given name, honoring Boris Yeltsin. The name may refer to:

Surname
Boris Yeltsin (1931–2007), President of Russia
Naina Yeltsina (born 1932), widow of Boris Yeltsin
Tatyana Dyachenko (née Yeltsina in 1960), daughter and presidential advisor of Boris Yeltsin

Given name
Yeltsin Álvarez (born 1994), Guatemalan footballer
Yeltsin Jacques (born 1991), Brazilian Paralympic runner
Yeltsin Tejeda (born 1992), Costa Rican footballer

See also
Yelchin

Russian-language surnames